Ampulla priamus is a species of sea snail, a marine gastropod mollusk in the family Volutidae, the volutes.

Description
The length of the shell attains 47 mm.

Distribution
This species lives in the West Mediterrean Sea and the Atlantic Ocean, only from Morocco to the Iberic peninsula.

References

External links

Volutidae
Gastropods described in 1791